The Envy of Gods is a 2000 Russian drama film directed by Vladimir Menshov.

Plot 
In the "History" Herodotus says, "The gods do not like happy people". In ancient times, people knew why they can not demonstrate their good fortune and happiness: it can cause jealousy and anger of the gods, because they believed that happiness is their, gods, privilege, and daring people who want the same thing, should be punished.

The film takes place in early autumn 1983 in Moscow, in an atmosphere of acute cold war (including the war in Afghanistan, the incident with the South Korean "Boeing", etc.).

The main heroine of the picture Sonia (Vera Alentova) is an editor in television, she has a son, a graduate of the school, and her husband Sergei (Aleksandr Feklistov) is a quite successful Soviet writer. One day to visit them a Frenchman Bernard (Gérard Depardieu) comes, whom Sergei met while working on a book about the French Resistance, accompanied by a French translator of Russian descent named André (Anatoly Lobotsky). André also has a family in Paris. However, this meeting turns their lives upside down. André falls in love with Sonia at first sight and emphatically tries to get a new meeting with her. Sonia, a faithful wife, educated in the Soviet tradition of chastity, at first refuses; moreover employees of Soviet television are not allowed to enter in unsupervised contact with foreigners. But André still gets his way, and Sonia is also overtaken by a violent passion. She discovers such strong feelings about the possibility of which she previously did not know. For a few days of their lives Sonia and Andre are absolutely happy. But they soon have to separate because their countries belong to different worlds, divided by the Iron Curtain.

Cast
 Vera Alentova as  Sonia
 Anatoly Lobotsky as  André
 Aleksandr Feklistov as  Sergei, Sonia's husband
 Gérard Depardieu as  Bernard
 Aleksandr Voroshilo as  Krapivin
 Vladlen Davydov as  Sonia's father
 Marina Dyuzheva as  Natasha, Sonia's friend
 Lyudmila Ivanova as  Sonia's mother-in-law
 Yuri Kolokolnikov as  Sonia's son
 Victor Pavlov as  Vilen
 Irina Skobtseva as  Sonia's mother
 Leonid Trushkin as  Vadim
 Larisa Udovichenko as  Irina
 Vladimir Yeryomin as  Igor, Natasha's husband
 Igor Kirillov as  cameo
 Anna Shatilova as  cameo
 Valery Prokhorov as  trucker
 Daniil Spivakovsky as  taxi driver
 Natalya Khorokhorina as  administrator of movie theatre
 Valentinа Ushakova as  railway worker
 Nina Yeryomina as  cameo

Soundtrack
 The Long Tango
 Meadows
 The Dream No.1
 The Date
 The Catastrophy No.1
 Loneliness
 Tango `Beter` by J.Menshova
 Thinking about the Past No.1
 The Catastrophy No.2
 Thinking about the Past No.2
 Saying Good-bye
 Finale

References

External links 
 
 

Fiction set in 1983
Films set in Moscow
Russian drama films
Films directed by Vladimir Menshov
Mosfilm films
2000 drama films
2000 films